This is a list of hotels in Pakistan, listed separately for four of its provinces, territories and other administrative units of Pakistan. The list is not a directory of every chain or independent hotel building in Pakistan.

Gilgit-Baltistan and Azad Kashmir
Khaplu Palace, Khaplu, Baltistan
Quaid-e-Azam tourist lodge, Barsala

Islamabad Capital Territory
The Centaurus, Islamabad

Khyber Pakhtunkhwa
Khan Klub, Peshawar

Punjab
Faletti's Hotel, Lahore 
Pearl Continental Bhurban, near Murree resort town

Sindh
Crescent Bay, Karachi

Nationwide chains
Pearl Continental

See also
 Lists of hotels – an index of hotel list articles on Wikipedia

References

External links

Lists of buildings and structures in Pakistan
Pakistan
Hotel chains in Pakistan
Tourism in Pakistan